Eleanor of Castile (Castilian: Leonor de Castilla; 10 September 1423 – 22 August 1425) was heir presumptive to the throne of the Crown of Castile and Princess of Asturias from 1424 until a few months before her death.

Eleanor was born an infanta of Castile. She was the second child of King John II of Castile and his first wife, Maria of Aragon. Eleanor's elder sister, Catherine, Princess of Asturias, died seven days after Eleanor's first birthday. Thus, the one-year-old infanta became heir presumptive to the throne. Her father had her recognised as successor to the kingdom and as Princess of Asturias by the Cortes of Valladolid shortly after her sister's funeral. The new Princess of Asturias received homage in the presence of her father, the King, in City of Burgos.

Princess Eleanor held this title and status for two months only. On 5 January 1425, she was displaced by the birth of a brother, the future King Henry IV of Castile. Now merely infanta and second-in-line to the throne again, Eleanor died the same year near the Cistercian monastery in La Espina. She was buried there, near the altar. She succeeded her sister, Catherine, Princess of Asturias, as Princess of Asturias in 1424.

Ancestry

References 

1423 births
1425 deaths
Castilian infantas
House of Trastámara
Princes of Asturias
People from Burgos
Spanish Roman Catholics
Spanish people of Italian descent
Spanish people of Portuguese descent
Spanish people of English descent
Spanish people of French descent
15th-century Spanish women
15th-century Castilians
Royalty and nobility who died as children
Daughters of kings